Kocaoba is a village in İzmir Province, Turkey. The population of the village is 204  as of 2011.

References

Villages in Dikili District